Khadijah Williams (born 29 December 1994) is a Jamaican international netball player. Primarily a midcourter, Williams debuted for the Jamaica national netball team, the Sunshine Girls, in 2013 against England. She was a member of the team that won bronze at the 2014 and 2018 Commonwealth Games, and that finished fourth at the 2015 Netball World Cup.

In 2017 Williams was temporarily suspended from the national team, along with fellow players Shanice Beckford and Nicole Dixon, during a team training incident, but was later cleared of all charges.

References

Jamaican netball players
Netball players at the 2014 Commonwealth Games
Netball players at the 2018 Commonwealth Games
Commonwealth Games bronze medallists for Jamaica
Commonwealth Games medallists in netball
1994 births
Living people
2019 Netball World Cup players
Medallists at the 2014 Commonwealth Games
Medallists at the 2018 Commonwealth Games
Medallists at the 2022 Commonwealth Games